Böbrach is a municipality in the district of Regen, in Bavaria, Germany.

References

External links

Information:
 Tourist information

Hotels & Restaurants:
 Sport- und Wellnesshotel Ödhof
 Brauerei Eck
 Weghof
 Landgasthof Muhr

Regen (district)